Charles Louis, Elector Palatine (22 December 1617 – 28 August 1680), was the second son of Frederick V of the Palatinate, the "Winter King" of Bohemia, and of Elizabeth Stuart, Queen of Bohemia and sister of Charles I of England.

After living the first half of his life in exile during the German Thirty Years' War and the English Civil War, in 1649 Charles Louis reclaimed his father's title of Elector Palatine along with most of his former territories.

Stuart and British politics

Charles Louis was baptised in March 1618 in the presence of the Prince of Sedan and Albertus Morton, who was the representative of the Prince of Wales. On the death of his exiled father in 1632, Charles Louis inherited his father's possessions in the Electorate of the Palatinate. His older brother Henry Frederick had died in the Netherlands in 1629.

Charles Louis and his younger brother Rupert spent much of the 1630s at the court of his maternal uncle, Charles I of England, hoping to enlist British support for his cause. Despite support from his mother's officials Curtius and Nethersole, the young Elector Palatine had limited success. He led an army of voluntaries from Britain (led by William Lord Craven) and the Palatinate (in alliance with Swedish forces under the command of the Scot Lieutenant General James King) at the Battle of Vlotho Bridge on 17 October 1638. Lord Craven, Prince Rupert and Colonel William Vavasour were captured after a rash charge by Prince Rupert (who tried to blame King). It is clear from the correspondence in the Swedish archives that King had managed to extract Charles Louis and his forces from the field and had them under his protection in Minden throughout October and November, a matter that caused much consternation to Field Marshal Banier who sowed rumours about King preferring the Elector's to Swedish service. This was something King forcefully rejected, although he did seek instruction as to how to deal with Charles Louis and his army.  Thereafter after Charles Louis retired first to The Hague, and then to Britain. In November 1641, Charles Louis sat in the Scottish Parliament and secured the right to 10,000 Scottish Covenanter soldiers who were to follow him to Germany. Unfortunately the Irish Rebellion broke out and these forces were diverted to Ireland to protect the Protestant community there.

Charles Louis afterwards became gradually estranged from the King, who feared that Charles Louis might become a focus for opposition forces in England. Indeed, in the English crisis leading up to the outbreak of the English Civil War, Charles Louis had considerable sympathy for the parliamentary leaders, especially the Earl of Essex, feeling them more likely to come to the aid of the Palatinate on the continent.  The Prince Palatine supported the execution of Strafford. Although Charles Louis was involved in the early stages of the Civil War with his uncle, he was mistrusted for his parliamentary sympathies, and soon returned to his mother in The Hague. There he distanced himself from the royalist (Cavalier) cause in the Civil War, fearing that Charles would sell him out for Spanish support.

In 1644, Charles Louis returned to England at the invitation of Parliament. He took up residence in the Palace of Whitehall and took the Solemn League and Covenant, even though his brothers, Rupert and Maurice, were Royalist generals. Contemporaries (including King Charles) and some in subsequent generations believed that Charles Louis's motive in visiting Roundhead London was that he hoped that Parliament would enthrone him in place of his uncle. Charles Louis's endorsement of the Parliamentary party was a cause of enmity between uncle and nephew, and when a captive Charles I met his nephew once again in 1647, the elder Charles accused the Prince of angling for the English throne. Charles Louis was still in England in October 1648 when the Peace of Westphalia restored the Lower Palatinate to him (the Upper Palatinate, to his great disappointment, remained under the Elector of Bavaria).  He remained in England long enough to see the execution of his uncle in January 1649, which appears to have come as a shock. The two had not reconciled prior to the King's death – Charles refused to see his nephew before his execution.

Electorate 
After this unhappy dénouement to Charles Louis's participation in English politics, he at last returned to the now devastated Electorate of the Palatinate in the autumn of 1649. Over the more than thirty years of his reign there, he strove with some success to rebuild his shattered territory. In foreign affairs, he pursued a pro-French course, marrying his daughter Elizabeth Charlotte to Philip I, Duke of Orléans, Louis XIV's brother, in 1671. After his restoration, his relations with his relatives continued to deteriorate – his British relations never forgave him for his course in the Civil War, while his mother and siblings resented his parsimony.

The most notable facet of his reign was probably his unilateral divorce of his wife, Charlotte of Hesse-Kassel, and subsequent marriage to Marie Luise von Degenfeld.  This second wife was given the unique title of Raugravine (Raugräfin, countess of uninhabited or uncultivated lands), and their children were known as the Raugraves.

Ancestry

Family

Notes

References

External links
 

1617 births
1680 deaths
Prince-electors of the Palatinate
House of Palatinate-Simmern
German people of the Thirty Years' War
Knights of the Garter
People of the English Civil War
German people of English descent
Burials at the Church of the Holy Spirit, Heidelberg
Sons of kings